Jonatan Persson (born 10 December 1970) is a Danish sailor. He competed in the 49er event at the 2000 Summer Olympics.

References

External links
 

1970 births
Living people
Danish male sailors (sport)
Olympic sailors of Denmark
Sailors at the 2000 Summer Olympics – 49er
Sportspeople from Copenhagen